Casper–Natrona County International Airport  is   northwest of Casper, in Natrona County, Wyoming. Before December 19, 2007 the airport was called Natrona County International Airport.

Scheduled passenger service is offered by SkyWest Airlines operating as Delta Connection on behalf of Delta Air Lines. Skywest Airlines, as well as CommutAir, operate as United Express on behalf of United Airlines as well.  These regional airlines operate regional jet aircraft into Casper.  Charter flights (known as "casino or gamblers' flights") are occasionally flown to Laughlin or Wendover, Nevada. Located near the airport is the NCIA Business Park, which houses a World War II museum and over 35 businesses ranging from manufacturing to aviation.

History

Casper AAF was assigned to Second Air Force as a heavy bomber (B-17; B-24) replacement training unit, with the 331st Bombardment Group being the training unit with four squadrons (461st, 462d, 463d and 464th Bombardment) training of personnel in heavy bomber operations.  The 331st Combat Crew Training School provided ground instruction. Once personnel completed the training course, they were sent to various combat units overseas as replacement personnel.

The 331st was converted to a Very Heavy (B-29) group in July 1944 and began training for deployment to Twentieth Air Force in the Pacific.  The 211th Army Air Force Base Unit took control of the airfield.   Casper AAF became part of Air Transport Command as a transit station for WASP pilots ferrying combat aircraft across the United States.   The airfield was inactivated in March 1945, and on 30 September 1945 was turned over to the Army Corps of Engineers as surplus.

The War Assets Administration turned the airfield over to civil control in the late 1940s, and in 1949 it became Natrona County Municipal Airport, replacing the former Casper Airport, Wardwell Field, whose runways are now streets in the town of Bar Nunn.

Past airline service

Western Airlines was the first carrier to serve Casper tracing its roots back to 1931 as Wyoming Air Service with a north-south route from Denver to Great Falls, Montana stopping in Cheyenne, Casper, Sheridan, Billings, and Lewiston. Wyoming Air Service changed to Inland Air Lines in 1938 and was merged into Western Airlines in 1952. A new east-west route was then added from Salt Lake City to Minneapolis stopping in Casper, then at Rapid City, Pierre, and Sioux Falls, South Dakota and the north-south route was extended onto Lethbridge and Calgary, Alberta, Canada. Aircraft types operated by Wyoming Air Service and Western over the years included Boeing 247, Douglas DC-3, Convair 240 and Douglas DC-6B propliners, and Lockheed L-188 Electra turboprops. By 1970 the carrier began operating Boeing 737-200 jetliners on both routes, still making all the stops however the north-south route then terminated at Billings. The north-south route ended in 1979 and the eastern portion of the east-west route extending into Minneapolis ended by 1983, leaving only flights to Salt Lake City and Rapid City. Larger Boeing 727-200 jets were occasionally flown through Casper and in 1987 Western was merged into Delta Air Lines. Delta continued service into Casper with nonstop flights to its Salt Lake City (SLC) hub as well as Rapid City until 1994 when all operations were turned over to SkyWest Airlines operating as the Delta Connection using Embraer 120 turboprops. SkyWest continues to serve Casper today with nonstops to Salt Lake City using Canadair CRJ-200 regional jets.

Challenger Airlines and successor Frontier Airlines served at Casper from the late 1940s until 1986.  In 1950, Frontier was serving the airport with Douglas DC-3 aircraft and by the early 1960s the airline had introduced larger Convair 340 and Convair 580 propliners.  By 1970, Frontier began replacing their Convair 580 turboprop flights with Boeing 737-200 jet service primarily to its Denver (DEN) hub as well as to Billings, Bozeman, and Missoula, Montana and Jackson and Riverton, Wyoming. All Frontier service ended when the airline shut down on August 24, 1986.

Continental Airlines began flights in 1980 when this air carrier was operating a hub at Denver and was serving Casper with Boeing 727-200 and Douglas DC-9-10 jetliners. Continental ceased mainline flights in 1985 and turned their respective services over to regional airline partners which operated code sharing flights as Continental Express with various turboprop aircraft types.  Continental Express service was operated by Pioneer Airlines (1985–1986), and Trans-Colorado Airlines (1986) with Fairchild Swearingen Metroliner aircraft. Continental reinstated mainline service on the Casper–Denver route for a short time in 1986–1987 then Continental Express service returned by Rocky Mountain Airways (1987–1991), and Britt Airways (1991–1994) with Beechcraft 1900C and ATR-42 aircraft. Final Continental representation was by GP Express (1994–1996) with Beechcraft 1900C aircraft. Continental then ended all hub operations at Denver and ceased all service to Casper. Prior to becoming a Continental Express air carrier in 1987, Rocky Mountain Airways served Casper from 1983 through 1985 as an independent airline with de Havilland Canada DHC-7 Dash 7 turboprops.

United Airlines began serving Casper in 1984 with nonstop Boeing 727-100, 727-200, and 737-200 jet flights to its Denver hub. In 1987, United mainline jets were replaced with United Express service flown by Aspen Airways (1987–1990) with Convair 580 turboprops and British Aerospace BAe 146-100 jet aircraft, then by Mesa Airlines (1990–1998) with Beechcraft 1900C, de Havilland Canada DHC-8 Dash 8 and Embraer EMB-120 Brasilia aircraft. Air Wisconsin then provided United Express service (1998–2002) with Dornier 328 propjets followed by Great Lakes Airlines (2001–2003) using Beechcraft 1900D aircraft. Great Lakes lost their designation as United Express in 2002 but continued to provide flights to Denver under its own branding. SkyWest Airlines then resumed United Express service in 2003 using Embraer 120 turboprops and later upgrading with Canadair CRJ-200 jets.  

Northwest Airlink, the code-share affiliate carriers operating for Northwest Airlines, served Casper on two occasions. The first was in 1986 with flights to Billings operated by Big Sky Airlines using Fairchild Swearingen Metroliner aircraft and then from 2004 through 2009 by Mesaba Airlines with flights to Minneapolis using Canadair CRJ-200 regional jets. Big Sky had been previously serving Casper under their own brand from 1980 through 1986 and returned for a short time in 2003 with flights to Billings, again under their own brand.

Allegiant Airlines served Casper from 2009 through 2017 with two flights per week to Las Vegas using McDonnell Douglas MD-80 jets.

From the 1970s through the 1990s, several other smaller commuter and regional carriers served Casper for short periods of time including Air US with flights to Denver using the regional airliner version of Grumman Gulfstream I business propjet.

Environmental investigation
As a formerly used defense site (FUDS) the Army has had to review sites according to the Comprehensive Environmental Response, Compensation and Liability Act since 1980. It was not until 2014, that funding became available. The Wyoming Department of Environmental Quality's main concern is chemical contamination in the area of a former landfill and sewage treatment plant. Together with the U.S. Army Corps of Engineers and the US Environmental Protection Agency it is investigating 12 sites.

Accidents and incidents 
On November 13, 1944, a USAF Douglas C-47 struck terrain and crashed shortly after takeoff 3.1 miles NW of then Casper AAF, Wyoming. All 11 occupants were killed.

On March 31, 1975, Western Airlines Flight 470 overran and veered off the runway into an irrigation ditch. All 99 people survived the incident, with injuries only occurring during evacuation. The National Transportation Safety Board had concluded that the pilot used poor judgement when it came to executing a missed approach.

Facilities

In the year ending December 31, 2018, the airport had 34,862 aircraft operations, average 95 per day: 62% general aviation, 6% scheduled airline, 29% air taxi and 2% military. 131 aircraft at the time were based at the airport: 105 single-engine, 11 multi-engine, 7 jet and 8 helicopter.

The airport is governed by a board of trustees with five members, each serving a five-year term.

Airlines and destinations

Passenger

SkyWest Airlines operates the CRJ-200 as Delta Connection and United Express to/from Casper.

Cargo

FedEx operates at a hangar leased by the airport, and receives flights daily from Memphis, Tennessee. FedEx operates Boeing 757-200s and Airbus A300/310s. FedEx Feeder flies Cessna 208s to serve the surrounding cities throughout Wyoming.

Statistics

Ground transportation
Taxi service and car rental agencies are available.  Several local hotels offer free shuttle service.

In popular culture
In the 2011 comedy film Bridesmaids, an airplane makes an emergency landing at the airport to deplane a rowdy flier and her group of friends.

See also

 Wyoming World War II Army Airfields

References
 Attribution

External links
 
 

1942 establishments in Wyoming
Airfields of the United States Army Air Forces Air Transport Command in North America
Airfields of the United States Army Air Forces in Wyoming
Airports established in 1942
Airports in Wyoming
Buildings and structures in Natrona County, Wyoming
Transportation in Natrona County, Wyoming